Compsocerus violaceus is a species of beetle in the family Cerambycidae. It occurs in South America, being common in southern Brazil, northern Argentina and Uruguay.

Agricultural pest 
Compsocerus violaceus is considered an agricultural pest, attacking several cultivated tree species, such as acacias, eucalypts, willows, fig trees, citrus trees and peach trees. Eggs are laid on tree trunks, usually inside small fissures in the bark. After eclosion, the larvae build a gallery below the bark in branches with diameters between 2 and 6 cm and start to feed on the wood, taking about 10 months to become adults. Adults have been reported to feed on fruits, flowers, and sap leaking from injured tree trunks.

Species that serve as host for Compsocerus violaceus include:

Anacardiaceae:
Schinopsis balansae Engl.
Schinus molle L.
Celastraceae:
Euonymus japonicus Thunb.
Fabaceae:
Acacia dealbata Link
Acacia melanoxylon R. Br.
Acacia praecox Griseb.
Acacia visco Griseb.
Adenanthera colubrina var. cebil (Griseb.) Altschul
Bauhinia forficata subsp. pruinosa (Vogel) Fortunato & Wunderlin
Calliandra tweedii Benth.
Cercis siliquastrum L.
Mimosa polycarpa var. spegazzinii Burkart
Prosopis affinis Spreng.
Prosopis hassleri Harms
Prosopis nigra Hieron.
Sesbania virgata (Cav.) Pers.
Fagaceae:
Castanea sativa Mill.
Quercus robur L.
Juglandaceae:
Carya illinoinensis (Wangenh.) K. Koch
Lauraceae:
Laurus nobilis L.
Lythraceae:
Punica granatum L.
Moraceae:
Ficus sp.
Myrtaceae:
Eucalyptus sp.
Oleaceae:
Ligustrum lucidum W.T.Aiton
Pinaceae:
Pinus sp.
Rosaceae:
Cerasus vulgaris Mill.
Crataegus sp.
Mespilus germanica L.
Prunus domestica L.
Rosa sp.
Rutaceae:
Citrus aurantium L.
Citrus limon (L.) Burm. f.
Citrus sinensis (L.) Osbeck
Salicaceae:
Salix fragilis L.
Sapindaceae:
Dodonaea viscosa Jacq.
Sapotaceae:
Chrysophyllum gonocarpum (Mart. & Eichler ex Miq.) Engl.
Ulmaceae:
Ulmus pumila L.

References

External links 
Friday Fellow: Violaceus longhorned beetle at Earthling Nature.

Compsocerini
Beetles described in 1853